Saint-Evroult-Notre-Dame-du-Bois is a commune in the Orne department in north-western France.

The commune is primarily known for the picturesque ruins of the Abbey of Saint-Evroul.

See also
 Communes of the Orne department
 The website of Saint-Evroult-Notre-Dame-du-Bois

References

Saintevroultnotredamedubois